The men's 4 × 100 metre freestyle relay event at the 2014 Commonwealth Games as part of the swimming programme took place on 25 July at the Tollcross International Swimming Centre in Glasgow, Scotland.

The medals were presented by Councillor Sadie Docherty, Lord Provost of Glasgow and the quaichs were presented by Fiona Kerr, Managing Director of First Glasgow.

Records
Prior to this competition, the existing world and Commonwealth Games records were as follows.

The following records were established during the competition:

Results

Heats

Final

References

External links

Men's 4 x 100 metre freestyle relay
Commonwealth Games